The Hotel Blanche (also known as the Blanche Hotel or The Blanche or Hancock Building) is a historic site in Lake City, Florida, United States. It is located at 212 North Marion Street. On January 18, 1990, it was added to the U.S. National Register of Historic Places.

History

Hotel Blanche was constructed in 1902 by Frank Pierce Milburn. A south wing was added in 1925 and a north wing was added in 1926. In the lobby of the building is the oldest elevator in Florida. It is still functional but is currently blocked off. Because the hotel was situated near the intersection of US 41/441, US 90, the Southern Railway, Interstate 10 and Interstate 75 it would bring in wealthy guests traveling through Florida. Many notable guests have stayed at the hotel including Al Capone on his way from Chicago to Miami and Johnny Cash. The hotel closed in 1967 leaving it to house several offices and shops.

Starting in January 2018, the city of Lake City began to renovate the Hotel Blanche. The project is expected to take 12–15 months, and all fixtures that are not historic are going to be demolished. Parts of the concrete elevator shaft have been removed from the hotel in the renovations. Originally, a portion of Marion Avenue was closed due to the construction, but it has since been reopened due to complaints from citizens as well as local businesses that were adversely effected by the closure.

References

External links
 Columbia County listings, Florida's Office of Cultural and Historical Programs

Gallery

Buildings and structures in Columbia County, Florida
Hotel buildings on the National Register of Historic Places in Florida
Frank Pierce Milburn buildings
Lake City, Florida
National Register of Historic Places in Columbia County, Florida